was founded during the Asuka period and is one of the Seven Great Temples of Nara, Japan.

History

A nine-story pagoda was added shortly afterwards. Like the Yakushi-ji, and Gangō-ji, the temple relocated to the new capital of Heijō-kyō in 716–17, and it was rebuilt as the Daian-ji in 729. Its importance declined when the capital moved again to Kyoto at the end of the Nara period. A succession of fires, a typhoon in 1459 and earthquakes in 1585 and 1596 destroyed most of the temple. The stone bases of the former twin pagodas were removed for reuse at Kashihara Jingū in 1889, while the ruins of the other buildings lie in adjacent properties.

Treasures
The temple houses nine statues in a style known as Daianji-yoshiki, but the acclaimed statue of Sakyamuni, said by the twelfth-century Oe no Chikamichi in Shichidaiji Junrei Shiki to have been the finest work in Nara, is now lost. The following Nara period statues have been designated Important Cultural Properties: a Jūichimen Kannon, Senjū Kannon, Fukūkensaku Kannon, Yōryū Kannon, Shō Kannon,  and a set of Four Heavenly Kings. Temple records of the Tenpyō era (747) have also been designated an Important Cultural Property and are now held in Chiba Prefecture.

See also

Glossary of Japanese Buddhism – explanation of terms concerning Japanese Buddhism, Buddhist art, and Buddhist temple architecture
Historical Sites of Prince Shōtoku
Nanto Shichi Daiji
Thirteen Buddhist Sites of Yamato

References

Asuka period
Zen temples
Buddhist temples in Nara, Nara
Historic Sites of Japan
Kōyasan Shingon temples
Sanron-shū
Prince Shōtoku